Bimalendra Nidhi (Maithili/Nepali/Devanagari: बिमलेन्द्र निधि  ) is a Nepali politician who serves as a member of the House of Representatives and a senior leader of Nepali Congress. He is the former Deputy Prime Minister of Nepal and Minister of Home Affairs of Nepal. Nidhi has also served as the Vice-president and General secretary of Nepali Congress, for tenures of four consecutive years each.

Personal life 
Born to one of the founders of  Nepali Congress Mahendra Narayan Nidhi and Prem Sagari Nidhi, Bimalendra Nidhi is the second son in the family. Nidhi family are residents of Nagrain Municipality, Dhanusha.

Political career

Bimalendra Nidhi joined student politics at the age of 14, after witnessing the arrest of his father. He is the former President of the Nepal Students Union(N.S.U), the student wing of Nepali Congress Party. He was only 23 when he led the union at national level appointed and favored by BP Koirala during 1980 Nepalese governmental system referendum.

He was elected vice-president of Nepali Congress Party on 4 May 2021.

He is the former General Secretary of Nepali Congress (Democratic) Party, a faction of Nepali Congress Party before Janandolan II movement citing differences in opinion, later assuming the same post after the two parties merged after the movement, until 2009.

He has served twice as the Minister for General Administration, once as the Minister for Education and Sports and simultaneously for a period of a month as Minister of Industries, Commerce and Supplies. He also served as the Minister for Physical Infrastructure and Transport. He served as Deputy Prime-minister of Nepal in Puspa Kamal Dahal second cabinet with Home minister portfolio. He led 15 ministers from Nepali Congress in the Second Dahal cabinet as a part of power sharing. He has also served as Acting prime-minister of Nepal.

He was arrested time and again for his political views, most notably in the People's Movement of 1990 when he was in his early 30's and then in Janandolan II while he was in his 40s. He has spent seven years in prison in total.

Nidhi was an elected twice as member to the Constituent Assembly from Dhanusha 3 of Dhanusha District. He also served as member of House of Representatives from 1994 to 2008 as representative from Dhanusha 4.
Nidhi, a close confidant of prime minister Sher Bahadur Deuba fielded candidacy for the post of party president leaving the camp in the 14th general convention of Nepali Congress. He was able to gerner nearly 6% voters opening the way for second round of election as Deuba who obtained 48% votes was unable to cross 50% mark even after joining hands with leader Krishna Prasad Sitaula. Later, Deuba asked Nidhi and Prakash Man Singh for their support and both leaders in absence of an alternative agreed to support Deuba.

In 2022 Nepalese general election, he chose to stand as a candidate for the House of Representatives from Proportional Representation list. He was elected as a member of House of Representatives from PR list of Nepali Congress on 14 December 2022.

In February 2023, he was the focal person in the gifting of two Shaligram stones from the Government of Nepal to the Shri Ram Janmabhoomi Teerth Kshetra, the stones would be used for the construction of the child form of the Hindu God Rama to be established in the Ram Mandir, Ayodhya.

Electoral history
1994 Legislative Election

Dhanusha-4

1999 Legislative Election

Dhanusha-4

2008 Constituent Assembly Election

Dhanusha-3

2013 Constituent Assembly Election

Dhanusha-3

2017 House of Representatives Election

Dhanusha-3

Education
He earned his M.A in Political Science from Tribhuvan University.

See also 
 Ram Saroj Yadav
 2022 Janakpur municipal election
 Om Prakash Sharma
 Anil Kumar Jha

References

1956 births
Living people
People from Dhanusha District
Madhesi people
Deputy Prime Ministers of Nepal
Nepali Congress politicians from Madhesh Province
Nepalese Hindus
Government ministers of Nepal
Nepali Congress (Democratic) politicians
Tribhuvan University alumni
Nepal MPs 1991–1994
Nepal MPs 1994–1999
Nepal MPs 1999–2002
Education ministers of Nepal
Nidhi family
Members of the 1st Nepalese Constituent Assembly
Members of the 2nd Nepalese Constituent Assembly
Nepal MPs 2022–present